Football Club Fassell is a football club based in Monrovia, Liberia. In 2014, the team won the Liberian Cup.

Honors
Liberian Cup: 1
 2014.

Performance in CAF competitions 
CAF Confederation Cup: 1 appearance
2015 - Preliminary Round

References

External links

Football clubs in Liberia